Yoan "Yoni" Stoyanov (born 22 May 2001) is a Bulgarian professional footballer who plays as a full back for Israeli Premier League club Sektzia Ness Ziona, on loan from Hapoel Be'er Sheva and the Bulgaria national team.

Early life
Born in Plovdiv, Bulgaria, Stoyanov moved to Israel as a junior and grew up in the city of Herzliya, Israel.

Club career
He started his football career in the local Israeli side Hapoel Herzliya. In 2020, he moved to Hapoel Kfar Saba.

International career
On 2 November 2021, Stoyanov received his first call-up to the Bulgarian under-21 side for 2023 UEFA European Under-21 Championship qualification matches against the Netherlands under-21 and Moldova under-21 sides. He made his debut for the team in the match against the Netherlands. He completed his debut in the match against Gibraltar on 23 September, won by Bulgaria with 5:1 result.

Career statistics

Club

Honours

Club 
Hapoel Be'er Sheva
Israel Super Cup: 2022

References

2001 births
Living people
Israeli footballers
Bulgarian footballers
Bulgaria youth international footballers
Hapoel Herzliya F.C. players
Hapoel Kfar Saba F.C. players
Hapoel Be'er Sheva F.C. players
Israeli Premier League players
Liga Leumit players
Bulgarian emigrants to Israel
Footballers from Herzliya
Israeli people of Bulgarian descent